Scott Porter (born 3 January 1985 in Sutherland, New South Wales) is an Australian former professional rugby league footballer who played with the Cronulla-Sutherland Sharks in the National Rugby League.

Playing career
Porter's junior club was the Cronulla Caringbah. After playing lower grades for the Cronulla Sharks he moved to Rockhampton play for the Central Comets the Queensland Cup. 

After moving back to the shire Porter then played in the New South Wales Rugby League south coast competition for the Wollongong Bulls. Porter almost gave the game away before making his first grade debut in 2009. His first match netted a dramatic win over the Parramatta Eels at Parramatta Stadium which ended a long losing streak dating back to round one.

References

External links

NRL profile

1985 births
Australian rugby league players
Cronulla-Sutherland Sharks players
Baroudeurs de Pia XIII players
Rugby league halfbacks
Rugby league five-eighths
Australian expatriate rugby league players
Expatriate rugby league players in France
Australian expatriate sportspeople in France
People from the Sutherland Shire
Rugby league players from Sydney
Living people